Kheyt ol Rovas (also Romanized as Kheyṭ ol Rovās) is a village in Veys Rural District, Veys District, Bavi County, Khuzestan Province, Iran. At the 2006 census, its population was 3,558, in 547 families.

References 

Populated places in Bavi County